The 175th Pennsylvania House of Representatives District is located in Philadelphia County and includes the following areas:

 Ward 02 [PART, Divisions 01, 15, 16, 25, 26 and 27]
 Ward 05 [PART, Divisions 01, 02, 03, 04, 05, 10, 12, 13, 16, 17, 18, 19, 21, 24, 25, 26 and 27]
 Ward 18 [PART, Divisions 02, 04, 05, 06, 07, 10, 11, 12 and 17]
 Ward 25 [PART, Divisions 09, 13, 14, 15, 16, 17, 18, 19, 20, 21 and 24]
 Ward 31 [PART, Divisions 01, 02, 03, 04, 05, 07, 08, 09, 10, 11, 12, 13 and 14]

Representatives

References

Government of Philadelphia
175